The Hatuqway are one of the twelve major Circassian tribes, representing one of the twelve stars on the green-and-gold Circassian flag. They were known for their art of war as a warrior tribe. After the Russo-Circassian War, their presence in the Caucasus was destroyed during the Circassian genocide, and their number was significantly decreased and today they exist only in small communities in various diasporas, and their names are not mentioned anymore in Circassian dialectology.

History and etymology

History 

The Hatuqway were a western Circassian tribal princedom whose homeland lay along the banks of the Kuban River. The Hatuqway people lived mostly in the mountains between the lower valleys of the Pshish River and the Belaya River. Due to their small size and closeness to Temirgoy tribe, they were considered as one of the subgroups of Temirgoy. Their neighbours were Bzhedug (West), Abadzekhs (South) and, naturally, Temirgoys (East).

In the time before the Russian invasion, the Hatuqway were known as a powerful and warlike tribe that fought many wars mostly against the Crimean Tatars.

Turkish explorer Evliya Çelebi compiled the oldest detailed description of the Hatuqway tribe, he wrote:

After Imperial Russia's conquest of the Caucasus in the 1860s the tribe's homeland was occupied, and its members were scattered among the other Circassian tribes, resulting in the Hatuqway effectively ceasing to exist as a separate entity.

Today, the Hatuqway have several villages in various diasporas. The Hatuqway dialect is one of the Circassian languages in big danger of extinction.

Etymology 
The widely accepted theory is that the names derives from Prince Inal the Great's son Temruk's son Hatko, who was prince of the Taman Peninsula. His principality is called Hatuqway (Place of Hatko) and the people of the principality are described as "From Hatuqway". Thus the name of the principality became the name of the tribe.

Another outdated theory about the origin of the name 'Hatuqway' is that it is from Хьаты ("Hatti") + Къуэ ("son"); meaning "Hattic son". 'Hatti' is an ancient name, originally referring to a non-Indo-European people of ancient Anatolia. Some researchers have claimed there may be links between Circassians and Indo-European-speaking communities, and some have argued that there are connections between Circassians and Hatti, who are from ancient Anatolian peoples, but these theories have not been addressed further and are not widely accepted. This Circassian tribe may preserve this name. This name also occurs elsewhere in the Caucasus in a Nart saga wherein the hero Batraz is said to speak in Hattic.

Culture and language

Culture 
Traditional Hatuqway culture is part of the Circassian culture. The Hatuqway were engaged in agriculture, cattle and horse breeding. Before Islam, the Hatuqways worshipped Jesus as well as the gods of Circassians such as Shibla (god of lightning and thunder), Sozeresh (god of fertility), Yamish, Ahin and Hakustash.

Language 
The Hatuqway speak the Hatuqway dialect of Adyghe, which is in the Circassian language branch of the Northwest Caucasian Languages. Nowadays, the number of speakers of this language has decreased considerably and it could not find a place in the literary language as there is no Hatuqway left in the Caucasus.

Hatuqway villages and families

Some Hatuqway villages in Turkey 
Some Hatuqway villages in Turkey.

Some Hatuqway clans in Turkey 

Some of the Hatuqway clans in Turkey.

See also 
 Circassians#Tribes
 Ethnic cleansing of Circassians
 Shapsugs
 Bzhedug
 Abzakhs
 Zhaney
 Mamkhegh
 Natukhai
 Temirgoy
 Besleney

References

External links 
 The Hatuqway nation

Ethnic groups in Russia
History of Kuban
Circassian tribes
Ethnic groups in Turkey
Adygea